Roudham is a small settlement and former civil parish, now in the parish of Roudham and Larling, in the Breckland district, in the county of Norfolk, England. It was once home to Roudham Junction railway station. There are remains of a medieval settlement. 
Today, East Harling is home to St George's Distillery, the oldest actual single malt whisky distillery in England

The parish is centred round the ruinous church remains of St Andrew's Church. The church was abandoned in 1736 after a destructive fire, although it remains to this day with all the walls remaining at their original height, the structure of the building is very weak. The church remains a significant monument in the landscape, however due to its weak condition, it had to be cordoned off due to the danger of it collapsing. Negotiations for the repair of the church are in progress.

Civil parish 
On 1 April 1935, the parish of Larling was merged with Roudham. On 14 August 2000, the new parish was renamed to "Roudham & Larling". In 1931 the parish of Roudham (prior to the merge) had a population of 151.

References

External links

Villages in Norfolk
Former civil parishes in Norfolk
Breckland District